Bensham Railway Station was a railway station serving the Bensham area of Gateshead in Tyne and Wear, England. It opened in 1868 and closed in 1954.

References

 The history of Bensham from Gateshead council
 Information on Bensham butterfly station

Former North Eastern Railway (UK) stations
Railway stations in Great Britain opened in 1868
Railway stations in Great Britain closed in 1954
Disused railway stations in Tyne and Wear